Rolando Meriño Betancourt is a baseball player for Cuba. He was born on February 17, 1971, in Santiago de Cuba and was part of the Cuban teams which won silver medals at the 2000 and 2008 Summer Olympics.

References

1971 births
Living people
2009 World Baseball Classic players
Olympic baseball players of Cuba
Baseball players at the 2000 Summer Olympics
Baseball players at the 2008 Summer Olympics
Olympic silver medalists for Cuba
Olympic medalists in baseball
Medalists at the 2008 Summer Olympics

Medalists at the 2000 Summer Olympics